The Eastern Townships is an historical administrative region in southeastern Quebec, Canada. It lies between the St. Lawrence Lowlands and the American border, and extends from Granby in the southwest, to Drummondville in the northeast. Since 1987, most of the area is within the administrative region Estrie, and the term Eastern Townships is now used in tourist literature.

The name derives from there also being western townships in Ontario.

History

Before European colonization the area was inhabited by the Abenaki, as attested by many toponyms such as Lake Memphremagog and Massawippi River.

Until 1791 the region was organized under the seigneurial system of New France. In 1791 the region was resurveyed under English law. It was divided into counties, which were in turn subdivided into townships.

Settlement by Europeans happened in three waves: first from New England, including some loyalists, then from the British Isles, and finally French-Canadians from surrounding areas.

From 1967 to 1981 the Eastern Townships were an administrative region of Quebec, (région 05). In 1981 the Commission de toponymie du Québec renamed it Estrie. In 1987 during the reorganization of the regional county municipalities, the region lost some territory:
 Arthabaska, Drummond, and parts of the counties of Wolfe and of Mégantic, moved to Centre-du-Québec.
 the other part of Mégantic moved to Chaudière-Appalaches
 Shefford and Missisquoi moved to Montérégie.
Although counties were abolished some survive as regional county municipalities, including Arthabaska, Brome, Compton, Frontenac, Missisquoi, and Shefford. Townships which survive as municipalities include: Cleveland, Hampden, Hatley, Lingwick, Marston, Melbourne, Orford, Memphrémagog, Potton, Saint-Camille, Sainte-Edwidge-de-Clifton, Stanstead, Stratford, Thetford, Valcourt, and Westbury.

References

Geography of Quebec
Geographic regions of Quebec
Tourism in Quebec
Estrie